David Grisman has issued albums with his groups the David Grisman Quintet and Old & In the Way, performed in duos with Jerry Garcia, Andy Statman, Martin Taylor, Hazel Dickens and Alice Gerrard, John Sebastian, Tony Rice, and played in the psychedelic band Earth Opera with Peter Rowan. He has produced solo albums and collaborated with musicians in many genres.

As leader or co-leader
 1966 Early Dawg (Sugar Hill)
 1976 The David Grisman Rounder Record (Rounder)
 1977 The David Grisman Quintet
 1978 Hot Dawg (Horizon)
 1980 Quintet '80 (Warner Bros.)
 1981 Stephane Grappelli/David Grisman Live (Warner Bros.)
 1981 Mondo Mando (Warner Bros.)
 1983 Here Today (Rounder)
 1982 Dawg Jazz/Dawg Grass (Warner Bros.)
 1983 David Grisman's Acoustic Christmas (Rounder)
 1983 Mandolin Abstractions (Rounder) with Andy Statman
 1984 Acousticity (MCA)
 1987 Svingin' with Svend  with Svend Asmussen (Zebra)
 1988 Home Is Where the Heart Is (Rounder)
 1990 Dawg '90 (Acoustic Disc)
 1991 Bluegrass Reunion (Acoustic Disc)
 1991 Jerry Garcia / David Grisman (Acoustic Disc) with Jerry Garcia
 1993 Dawgwood (Acoustic Disc)
 1993 Not for Kids Only (Acoustic Disc) with Jerry Garcia
 1993 Common Chord (Rounder)
 1994 Tone Poems (Acoustic Disc) with Tony Rice
 1995 Tone Poems 2 (Acoustic Disc) with Martin Taylor
 1995 Dawganova (Acoustic Disc)
 1995 Songs of Our Fathers (Acoustic Disc) with Andy Statman
 1996 Shady Grove (Acoustic Disc) with Jerry Garcia
 1996 DGQ-20 (Acoustic Disc)
 1997 Doc & Dawg with Doc Watson
 1998 So What (Acoustic Disc) with Jerry Garcia
 1999 Retrograss (Acoustic Disc)
 1999 Dawg Duos (Acoustic Disc)
 1999 I'm Beginning to See the Light (Acoustic Disc)
 2000 The Pizza Tapes (Acoustic Disc) with Jerry Garcia and Tony Rice
 2000 Tone Poems 3 (Acoustic Disc)
 2001 Grateful Dawg (Acoustic Disc) with Jerry Garcia
 2001 Traversata (Acoustic Disc) with Carlo Aonzo and Beppe Gambetta
 2001 New River with Denny Zeitlin
 2002 Dawgnation (Acoustic Disc)
 2003 Hold On, We're Strummin' (Acoustic Disc) with Sam Bush
 2003 Life of Sorrow (Acoustic Disc)
 2004 Been All Around This World (Acoustic Disc) with Jerry Garcia
 2006 New Shabbos Waltz (Acoustic Disc) with Andy Statman
 2006 Dawg's Groove (Acoustic Disc)
 2006 DGBX (Acoustic Disc)
 2007 The Living Room Sessions
 2007 Satisfied  (Acoustic Disc) with John Sebastian
 2011 Folk Jazz Trio (Acoustic Disc)
 2011 Live at Wigmore Hall 4/21/96 (Acoustic Disc)
 2016 Del & Dawg Live! (Acoustic Disc)
 2016 David Grisman Sextet (Acoustic Disc)
 2017 Muddy Roads (Acoustic Disc)
 2017 Frank 'n' Dawg (Acoustic Disc) with Frank Vignola
 2017 Pickin (Acoustic Disc) with Tommy Emmanuel
 2019 The Dawg Trio (Acoustic Disc) with Danny Barnes and Samson Grisman

As group member
With Earth Opera
 Earth Opera – 1968
 The Great American Eagle Tragedy – 1969

With Muleskinner
 Muleskinner (1973) (re-released as A Potpourri of Bluegrass Jam)
 Muleskinner Live: Original Television Soundtrack (1994, recorded 1973)

With Old & In the Way
 Old & In the Way – 1975
 That High Lonesome Sound – 1996
 Breakdown – 1997
 Old & In the Gray – 2002
 Live at the Boarding House – 2008
 Live at the Boarding House: The Complete Shows – 2013

Chronological discography

1964–1970
 The Even Dozen Jug Band – 1964
 Won't You Come and Sing for Me – 1965, released 1973
 Early Dawg – 1966 (Live in New York)
 Earth Opera – 1968
 The Great American Eagle Tragedy – 1969
 American Beauty (album) – 1970 (played on two songs, "Friend of the Devil" and "Ripple")

1971–1980
 Muleskinner (1973)
 Old & In the Way – 1975
 Eat My Dust soundtrack – 1976
 The David Grisman Rounder Record – 1976
 The David Grisman Quintet – 1977
 Hot Dawg – 1978
 Bluegrass Guitar with Eric Thompson – 1979
 Quintet '80 – 1980

1981–1990
 Mondo Mando – 1981
 Stephane Grappelli/David Grisman Live – 1981
 Here Today – 1982
 David Grisman's Acoustic Christmas – 1983
 Dawg Jazz/Dawg Grass – 1983
 Mandolin Abstractions – 1983
 Acousticity – 1984
 Svingin' with Svend – 1987
 Home Is Where the Heart Is – 1988
 Dawg '90 – 1990

1991–2000
 Jerry Garcia / David Grisman – 1991
 Bluegrass Reunion – 1992
 Common Chord – 1993
 Not for Kids Only – 1993
 Dawgwood – 1993
 Tone Poems – 1994
 Dawganova – 1995
 Songs of Our Fathers – 1995
 Tone Poems 2 – 1995
 DGQ-20 – 1996
 Shady Grove – 1996
 That High Lonesome Sound 1996
 Breakdown 1997
 Doc & Dawg – 1997
 Muleskinner Live: Original Television Soundtrack (1998, recorded 1973)
 So What – 1998
 Retrograss – 1999
 Dawg Duos – 1999
 I'm Beginning to See the Light – 1999
 Tone Poems 3 – 2000
 The Pizza Tapes – 2000

2001–2010
 Grateful Dawg – 2001
 New River – 2001
 Traversata – 2001
 Old & In the Gray – 2002
 Dawgnation – 2002
 Life of Sorrow – 2003
 Hold On, We're Strummin' – 2003
 Been All Around This World – 2004
 Dawg's Groove – 2006
 DGBX – 2006
 New Shabbos Waltz – 2006
 The Living Room Sessions – 2007
 Satisfied – 2007
 Live at the Boarding House recorded 1973, released 2008

2011–present
 David Grisman's Folk Jazz Trio – 2011
 Live at Wigmore Hall – 2011
 Live at the Boarding House: The Complete Shows – 2013 (recorded 1973)
 Del & Dawg Live! – 2016
 David Grisman Sextet – 2016
 Muddy Roads – 2017
 Frank 'n' Dawg – 2017
 Pickin – 2017
 The Dawg Trio - 2019

References

Discographies of American artists